The 1999 FIA GT Oschersleben 500 km was the sixth round the 1999 FIA GT Championship season.  It took place at the Motorsport Arena Oschersleben, Germany, on August 8, 1999.

Official results
Cars failing to complete 70% of winner's distance are marked as Not Classified (NC).

Statistics
 Pole position – #5 Eschmann – 1:26.457
 Fastest lap – #1 Chrysler Viper Team Oreca – 1:28.243
 Average speed – 142.912 km/h

References

 
 

O
FIA GT Oschersleben